Here Come the Waterworks is the second album by heavy metal band Big Business. It was released by Hydra Head Records on March 6, 2007, to critical acclaim.

Track listing

Personnel
Band members
 Jared Warren - Bassist, Vocalist
 Coady Willis - Drums
 David Scott Stone - Guitars, Voyager

Other personnel
 Recorded, Mixed, and Produced by Phil Ek at AVAST! and AVAST II, Seattle, WA
 Assistant Engineer - Cameron Nicklaus
 Mastered by JJ Golden at Golden Mastering
 Art Direction and Production by Kevin Willis and Jake Manny
 Photography by Robin Laananen

References

2007 albums
Big Business (band) albums
Hydra Head Records albums
Albums produced by Phil Ek